Sandra von Giese (born 15 November 1939) is a Filipino former swimmer. She competed in the women's 100 metre butterfly at the 1960 Summer Olympics, where she was eliminated in the heats. She is the sister of Jocelyn von Giese.

References

External links
 

1939 births
Living people
Filipino female swimmers
Olympic swimmers of the Philippines
Swimmers at the 1960 Summer Olympics
Sportspeople from Manila
Asian Games medalists in swimming
Asian Games gold medalists for the Philippines
Asian Games silver medalists for the Philippines
Asian Games bronze medalists for the Philippines
Swimmers at the 1954 Asian Games
Swimmers at the 1958 Asian Games
Medalists at the 1954 Asian Games
Medalists at the 1958 Asian Games